Fairfield Junior-Senior High School is public secondary school located in Goshen, Indiana, and part of Fairfield Community Schools. It serves about 949 students in grades 7 through 12 coming from New Paris Elementary School, Millersburg Elementary School, and Benton Elementary School.

Demographics
The demographic breakdown of the 2011-2012 enrollment is:
White - 93.4%
Hispanic - 4.4%
Multiracial - 1.1%
Asian/Pacific Islander - 0.6%
Black - 0.3%
Native American - 0.2%
Male - 51.4%
Female - 48.6%

Athletics 

Fairfield's school colors are navy blue and gold. Its athletic teams compete as the Falcons. They are part of the Northeast Corner Conference (NECC). The following IHSAA sports are offered:

Baseball (boys)
Basketball (boys and girls)
Cross Country (boys and girls)
Football (boys)
Golf (boys and girls)
Softball (girls)
Tennis (boys and girls)
Track and field (boys and girls)
Volleyball (girls)
Wrestling (boys)
The girls basketball team won the 2023 IHSAA 3A State Championship. That same team held its opponents to only scoring an average of 28.3 per game. The best in the state.

See also
 List of high schools in Indiana

References

External links 
Fairfield Junior-Senior High School website

Goshen, Indiana
Public middle schools in Indiana
Public high schools in Indiana
Schools in Elkhart County, Indiana